The 1991–92 WFA National League Premier Division was the inaugural season of nationalised women's league football in England. The Women's Football Association (WFA) obtained a grant from the Sports Council in order to launch the league, described by Jean Williams as "a crucial step in adopting the structures of the male game."

Manager Brian Broadhurst guided Doncaster Belles to the Women's National League championship with a 100% record. The Belles also avenged their defeat in the previous year's Women's FA Cup final to win a League and Cup double.

Red Star Southampton finished in second place, with player-manager Pat Chapman amongst many players who boasted England caps and FA Cup winners' medals from their days with the defunct Southampton WFC. Veteran 47-year-old goalkeeper Sue Buckett had a record eight winners' medals from her 10 Cup final appearances, as well as 30 outings for England (1972–81, 1984).

Friends of Fulham, Women's FA Cup winners in 1985 and runners-up in 1989 and 1990, came under the auspices of Wimbledon F.C. and played their Premier Division home fixtures at Plough Lane, recently vacated by the male team. The squad included England internationals Theresa Wiseman, Marieanne Spacey, Brenda Sempare, Terri Springett (daughter of Ron) and Debbie Bampton.

Newton Ladies, a Merseyside club formed by former England midfielder Liz Deighan in May 1989, linked up with Knowsley United F.C. to join the league as Knowsley United WFC. Deighan, also the WFA's England Under-21 team boss, led Knowsley to a fourth-place finish.

Millwall Lionesses had beaten Doncaster Belles in the previous season's FA Cup final but suffered a subsequent exodus of players. Lou Waller remained and Pauline Cope rejoined from Arsenal, to buttress a youthful squad.

National Division

Final table:

No relegation as league expanded to 10 teams for 1992–93.

Northern/Southern Divisions
The Northern Division champions were Bronte L.F.C. and the Southern champions were Arsenal L.F.C. Both joined the expanded Premier Division for the 1992–93 season.

See also
 1991–92 WFA Women's National League Cup

References

Premier League
FA Women's National League seasons
Wom
1